Florencia Natasha Busquets Reyes (born 27 June 1989) is an Argentinean volleyball player who participated with the Argentina national team at the Pan-American Volleyball Cup (in 2009, 2010, 2012, 2013, 2014, 2015, 2016), the FIVB Volleyball World Grand Prix (in 2011, 2012, 2013, 2014, 2015, 2016), the 2011 FIVB Volleyball Women's World Cup in Japan, the 2014 FIVB Volleyball Women's World Championship in Italy, the 2018 FIVB Volleyball Women's World Championship, and the 2016 Summer Olympics in Brazil.

At club level she played for Talleres de Remedios de Escalada, Instituto Municipal del Deporte (IMDEP) de Lomas de Zamora, Ferro Carril Oeste, River Plate, Club Atlético y Biblioteca Bell, Deportivo Géminis, Sporting Cristal, Boca Juniors, CS Volei Alba-Blaj and Club Atlético Villa Dora and Franches-Montagnes.

Clubs
  Talleres de Remedios de Escalada (junior)
  IMDEP (2004–2005)
  Club Ferro Carril Oeste (2006–2008)
  River Plate (2008–2010)
  Bell Vóley (2010–2012)
  Deportivo Géminis (2012–2012)
  Boca Juniors (2013–2013)
  Club Sporting Cristal (2013–2013)
  Villa Dora (2013–2014)
  CS Volei Alba-Blaj (2014–2014)
  Franches-Montagnes (2014–2015)
  Boca Juniors (2015–2016)
  Franches-Montagnes (2016–present)

Awards

Individuals
 2008–09 Argentinian League "Best Blocker" 
 2012–13 Peruvian League "Best Blocker"
 2013–14 Argentinian League "Best Blocker"

National team
 2011 South American Championship –  Silver Medal

References

External links
 Profile at CEV

1989 births
Living people
Argentine women's volleyball players
Sportspeople from Lanús
Olympic volleyball players of Argentina
Volleyball players at the 2016 Summer Olympics
Middle blockers
Expatriate volleyball players in Peru
Expatriate volleyball players in Romania
Expatriate volleyball players in Switzerland
Argentine expatriate sportspeople in Peru
Argentine expatriate sportspeople in Romania
Argentine expatriate sportspeople in Switzerland